State Route 199 (SR 199) is a  route that serves as a connection between SR 81 in Tuskegee with SR 14 east of Tallassee.

Route description
The southern terminus of SR 199 is located at its intersection with SR 81 near Tuskegee. From this point, the route travels in a northwesterly direction, where it passes under I-85 without an interchange, towards Chehaw where it turns to the west before resuming its northwesterly track just west of the city limits. It continues in this direction through to just south of Woodland where it turns to the north en route to its northern terminus at SR 14. North of its terminus, it continues as Macon County Road 35 (CR 35).

Major intersections

References

199
Transportation in Macon County, Alabama